"Golden Love" is the fifth single from New Zealand band Midnight Youth's debut album, The Brave Don't Run.

The song was featured on the season finale of US drama One Tree Hill in mid-2010. It was later played on the South Korean TV series Uncontrollably Fond in 2016.

Background
Jeremy Redmore, the lead singer of Midnight Youth, originally wrote and recorded "Golden Love" as a Christmas present for members of his family. The following year the band re-recorded the song for their album.

References

Midnight Youth songs
2009 singles
2009 songs